Gdańsk Zaspa railway station is a railway station serving the city of Gdańsk, in the Pomeranian Voivodeship, Poland. The station opened in 1952 and is located on the Gdańsk Śródmieście–Rumia railway. The train services are operated by SKM Tricity.

History
The station was formerly known as Gdańsk Lotnisko because of its location close to the airport. After the closure of the original Gdańsk Airport in 1974, this district of the city was developed and its name changed. The purpose of the station changed from providing connections to the airport, to serving the residents of the district.

When Pope John Paul II celebrated mass in the nearby Zaspa quarter during his 1987 pilgrimage to Gdańsk the stop played a significant role: almost a million citizens reached this location via the SKM service.

Train services
The station is served by the following services:

Szybka Kolej Miejska services (SKM) (Lębork -) Wejherowo - Reda - Rumia - Gdynia - Sopot - Gdansk

References

 This article is based upon a translation of the Polish language version as of November 2016.

External links

Railway stations in Poland opened in 1952
Railway stations served by Szybka Kolej Miejska (Tricity)
Zaspa